Reynolds Scott Wolf (born March 16, 1970) is an American meteorologist and journalist currently employed by The Weather Channel. He formerly worked for CNN, where his forecasts could usually be seen on CNN Saturday Morning, CNN Sunday Morning, and weekend editions of CNN Newsroom. He also served as a weather correspondent and reporter on other CNN programs.

Wolf is currently a host of AMHQ Weekend and occasionally on AMHQ.

Early life and career
Born in Charlotte, North Carolina, and raised in Jemison, Alabama, Wolf is a graduate of Jacksonville State University and has a certificate in Broadcast Meteorology from Mississippi State University. He has worked in many television stations across the United States, including KMOV in St. Louis, Missouri, WDIV-TV in Detroit, Michigan, WKMG in Orlando, Florida, KXAN-TV in Austin, Texas, KSBY in San Luis Obispo, California, and WJSU in Anniston, Alabama.

CNN
Wolf joined CNN in 2006, and was released in May 2012. He made his debut on The Weather Channel as part of their Hurricane Isaac coverage on August 26, 2012.

Memberships
Wolf is a member of the American Meteorological Society and the National Weather Association, as well as the Alpha Tau Omega fraternity.

Personal life
Wolf is married to Erin Cogswell Wolf and they have four children, three girls and one boy. They live near Atlanta, Georgia

Wolf is an avid fly-fisherman, outdoorsman, adventurer, and conservationist.

References
Notes

External links

Reynolds Wolf profile at CNN.com

1970 births
Living people
People from Charlotte, North Carolina
American television meteorologists
Mississippi State University alumni
People from Chilton County, Alabama
Jacksonville State University alumni
CNN people
The Weather Channel people